333 Squadron of the Royal Norwegian Air Force is a maritime patrol aircraft squadron. It traces its history, unbroken, to the establishment of No. 333 (Norwegian) Squadron Royal Air Force of the Second World War, formed in February 1942.

History

The Squadron was established as a detachment (No. 1477 (Norwegian) Flight) under the 210 Squadron of the British Royal Air Force, on 8 February 1942, by Captain Finn Lambrechts. The squadron was located in Woodhaven, Fife, Scotland. On 10 May 1943 333 squadron was formed from this flight with Mosquito Mk.IIs at RAF Leuchars and PBY-1b Catalinas at Woodhaven. The Mosquitoes were operated on shipping reconnaissance flights along the Norwegian coast, whilst the Catalinas carried out anti-submarine patrols to the north of Scotland. The squadron's Catalinas also operated in the 'Special Duties' role landing both personnel and supplies at points along the Norwegian coast.
In September 1944 the Mosquito flight joined the Banff strike wing and acted in the Pathfinder role. However, on 30 May 1945 this flight was redesignated No. 334 (Norwegian) Squadron RAF and No. 333 became a pure Catalina unit.

On their first mission to Norway, the poet, and news-reporter Nordahl Grieg was with 333 Squadron to report from the flight. This was then a secret mission. After this mission, he wrote the poem Flagget. During the Second World War, the missions of 333 Squadron included dangerous search-and-destroy submarine missions, patrolling, and secret missions along the Norwegian coastline, behind the German defence lines. They landed and picked up agents, illegal radios, and transmitters. They also dropped Christmas presents to the Norwegian population, and did search and rescue missions.

Post-war
After the war, the squadron returned to Norway, being based at Fornebu, helping to rebuild the northern parts of the country, transporting people and equipment from the south to the north. The oil-activity, establishment of the Norwegian economic zone, and establishment of the coast-guard, created new demands on the squadron. They had to carry out surveillance of large sea areas, requiring new airplanes, the Lockheed P-3 Orion.

In the 1980s the squadron undertook search-and-destroy submarine missions along the coastline and in the fjords. Several times they have dropped live weapons against submarines that were illegally operating in Norwegian territorial waters. In the 1990s, the Russian Northern Fleet was reduced by half, although it still has 67 operational submarines, and a large fleet of ships.

Today the squadron regularly does various missions, including surveillance of military maritime operations, patrolling the economic zone, controlling fishing and resources, submarine searches, and search and rescue missions. They also take part in international missions and training. The squadron is the only one that has been active continuously since World War II, and is today a part of the 133 Air Wing.

Aircraft operated

 = Two of the P-3Bs were modified to P-3N standard and all still are in service (Fritjof Nansen, Roald Amundsen, Gunnar Isachsen, Otto Sverdrup, Hjalmar Riiser Larsen, Bernt Balchen, Finn Lambrechts)

Bases operated from

References

Notes

Bibliography

 Halley, James J. The Squadrons of the Royal Air Force & Commonwealth 1918–1988. Tonbridge, Kent, UK: Air Britain (Historians) Ltd., 1988. .
 Jefford, C.G. RAF Squadrons, a Comprehensive Record of the Movement and Equipment of all RAF Squadrons and their Antecedents since 1912. Shrewsbury, Shropshire, UK: Airlife Publishing, 2001. .
 Rawlings, John D.R. Coastal, Support and Special Squadrons of the RAF and their Aircraft. London: Jane's Publishing Company Ltd., 1982. .

Further reading
Joris Janssen Lok, 'Flying north for the winter,' Jane's Navy International, April 2001
Barents Observer,  - move to Everns in prospect for 2023

External links
 History of No.'s 330–352 Squadrons at RAF Web
 333 Skvadronen, Royal Norwegian Air Force (in Norwegian)

Royal Norwegian Air Force squadrons
Military units and formations of Norway in World War II
Maritime patrol aircraft squadrons
Military units and formations established in 1943